Columna may refer to:

 Columna (gastropod) a genus of snails
 The Column (film), a 1968 Romanian historical film directed by Mircea Drăgan . 
 Columna Lactaria "Milk Column" was a landmark in ancient Rome in the Forum Holitorium